The Chinese Ambassador to East Timor is the official representative of the People's Republic of China to East Timor.

List of representatives

See also
China–East Timor relations

References 

East Timor
China
China–East Timor relations